Angelika Bischof-Delaloye is a former emeritus professor at the University Lausanne, Lausanne, Switzerland.

Career
During 1998–2009, Bischof-Delaloye was a full professor at the Nuclear Medicine Department at the University Lausanne, and the Department Head, of Nuclear Medicine, Center Hospital University Vaudois, in Lausanne.

She has served at the European Board of Nuclear Medicine during 2006. She wrote the editorial article in 2011 for European Journal of Nuclear Medicine and Molecular Imaging (EJNMMI) to introduce the open-access journal called European Journal of Nuclear Medicine and Molecular Imaging Research (EJNMMI Res) in the area of basic, translational and clinical research in nuclear medicine. She currently serves as the editor-in-chief of EJNMMI Res journal.

She obtained her MD degree from the University Innsbruck, Austria, 1968. She published her first scientific paper in 1971 titled "Segmental, Sequential and Quantitative Pulmonary Investigations Using the Scintillation Camera" in the Journal of Nuclear Biology and Medicine. During her career, she published over 254 scientific manuscripts with more than 4713 citations, written many book chapters, and organised symposiums. She is also mentioned in the book "History of Nuclear Medicine in Europe," which was published in 2003.

Selected publications 

 Endorsement of International Consensus Radiochemistry Nomenclature Guidelines.
 EJNMMI Research: A New Journal in Nuclear Medicine.
 EJNMMI Physics—access Is Open for Open Access.

References

External links 
 
 European Board of Nuclear Medicine 2006

Year of birth missing (living people)
Living people
Nuclear medicine physicians
Nuclear medicine
Swiss editors
Swiss women editors
Swiss women scientists
Academic staff of the University of Lausanne
University of Innsbruck alumni
Swiss women academics
21st-century Swiss scientists